StormPay of TN was an electronic money auction payment processor run by Stormpay Incorporated, a Clarksville, Tennessee, United States company founded in October 2002. It allowed anyone with an e-mail address to buy or sell StormPay Auction items after opening an online account.

For a prolonged period spanning February 8 to 10, 2006, the StormPay website was again unavailable due to a DDOS attack. Being a registered company, records were filed with the Tennessee Department of State and open to public viewing.

StormPay was not a member of the Better Business Bureau, although it generated more complaints to BBB than any other Middle Tennessee or Southern Kentucky business.

References

Customers upset because money unavailable at StormPay.com: The Leaf-Chronicle; Clarksville, TN. 02-06-2006
The Leaf-Chronicle; Clarksville, TN. 01-20-2006, 02-08-2006

External links
 StormPay.com

Economy of Clarksville, Tennessee
Digital currencies